Nissen may refer to:

 Nissen (surname)
 Saint Nissen, a 5th century Irish abbot 
 a creature in Norse mythology, see Tomte
 a Nissen hut, a building shaped like a tube cut in half along the middle and made from corrugated iron sheets
 the Nissen Building in Winston-Salem, North Carolina 
 Nissen fundoplication, a surgical procedure to treat gastroesophageal reflux disease and hiatal hernia